Tinagma brunneofasciatum is a moth in the Douglasiidae family. It is found in North America, where it has been recorded from Alberta.

References

Moths described in 1990
Douglasiidae